Langelurillus furcatus is  a jumping spider species in the genus Langelurillus that lives in Tanzania. The species is closely related to Langelurillus alboguttatus.

References

Salticidae
Fauna of Tanzania
Spiders described in 2000
Spiders of Africa
Taxa named by Wanda Wesołowska